Liviu Marinescu (born February 12, 1970, in Bucharest) is a Romanian composer of orchestral and chamber music. He teaches at California State University, Northridge.

Early life 
He studied music composition at the National University of Music Bucharest with Adrian Iorgulescu, and Cleveland State University with Edwin London. In 2000 he completed his Doctor of Musical Arts degree at University of Maryland, where he worked with Lawrence Moss.

Career 
His music has been recorded and released by Capstone Records, Centaur Records, Navona Records and has been performed by the Cleveland Chamber Symphony, Orchestra 2001, Bohuslav Martinu Symphony, as well as the National Chamber Radio Orchestra and the Bucharest Music Academy Symphony in Romania.

In 2002 he was awarded a prize and commission by the Fromm Foundation at Harvard University.

In 1994 began working as a professor. Marinescu taught at Concordia College, West Chester University, University of Maryland and Cleveland State University, and lectured at universities across Europe, including Trondheim Conservatory in Norway, Palacky University in the Czech Republic and the National University of Music in Bucharest.

Compositions

External links
 Liviu Marinescu's biography at California State University, Northridge
 Liviu Marinescu's website

1970 births
National University of Music Bucharest alumni
Cleveland State University alumni
University of Maryland, College Park alumni
Romanian composers
Musicians from Bucharest
Living people
West Chester University faculty